Chris Pirillo  is an American entrepreneur and former television personality. He is the founder and former CEO of LockerGnome, Inc., a now-defunct network of blogs, web forums, mailing lists, and online communities which are now closed. He is best known as the former host of Call for Help, a call-in tech support show which, at the time, aired on TechTV. He hosted the show from 2001 to 2003.

Career
Pirillo began his career in 2000 as the host of a call-in technical support show on WHO (AM) in Des Moines, Iowa. The following year, TechTV hired Pirillo to host Call for Help.

LockerGnome began as a technology mailing list in 1996, offering tips and tricks for operating systems and applications, software suggestions (with an emphasis on public domain and shareware software), and web site recommendations. Several mailing lists are now provided, offering technology advice and tips and other content syndicated from LockerGnome's blogs for IT Professionals. A web forum for help with and discussions about technology was run from 2002 to 2015.

Pirillo along with Jake Ludington, created a BitTorrent server at vistatorrent.com "to help Microsoft get Windows Vista Beta 2 in users' hands" in 2006. According to Information Week, Microsoft had "reported problems in delivering Beta 2 electronically recommending that users order the DVD rather than download the 3.5–4.4GB file". Microsoft sent a cease and desist e-mail, and the pair complied.

Pirillo is the author of several books, including Poor Richard's E-mail Publishing, Online! The Book with John C. Dvorak and Wendy Taylor.

In March 2015, Pirillo announced he was resuming Gnomedex, but providing more of a fair or festival experience than as a single-track conference.

In 2019, Pirillo joined Intel as a community advocate.

References

External links 

 
 
 

Living people
American bloggers
American writers of Italian descent
Writers from Des Moines, Iowa
People from Issaquah, Washington
Writers from Seattle
TechTV people
University of Northern Iowa alumni
21st-century American non-fiction writers
YouTubers
Year of birth missing (living people)